Hebryzelmis (Ancient Greek: Εὐρύζελμις, Ἑβρύζελμις, Ἑβροζέλμης, Εὐρύτελμις) was an Odrysian king of Thrace, attested as ruling in 386/385 BC.

The origins of Hebryzelmis are unclear, although it has been proposed that he should be identified with the Abrozelmēs recorded as emissary and official interpreter sent by Seuthes II to Xenophon in 401/400 BC. While the two names are likely to be different Greek renditions of the same Thracian name, and Thracian princes could serve as emissaries, other considerations have led to the identification of Herbyzelmis as a member of a different, senior line of the Odrysian dynasty, and as possible son of Seuthes I and brother of his successor Cotys I. Possibly supporting this identification is a brief and poorly preserved inscription apparently dating to the 4th century BC, which mentions a certain "Herbyzelmis, (son) of Seuthes, Prianeus," although if the epithet refers to the Ionian city of Priene, the connection would be both surprising and implausible.

Hebryzelmis evidently succeeded Amadocus I as the chief king of Odrysian Thrace shortly after 390/389 BC, and was apparently opposed by Amadocus' former protege and rival Seuthes II. Hebryzelmis appears to have gained the upper hand, and Seuthes II only retained (or regained) his own lands with the help of the Athenian general Iphicrates, although Athens was allied with Hebryzelmis. Apart from the Athenian degree from 386/385 BC, which praises Hebryzelmis as an ally and confers upon him the honors voted on his predecessors, the only primary sources on Hebryzelmis' reign are his four types of coins. Most of them bear a "heraldic" device of a two-handled vessel, which is also found on the coins of Cotys I and Cersobleptes and has been used to identify these rulers as members of the same branch of the royal dynasty. The quick disappearance of Hebryzelmis from the throne implied by the accession of Cotys I in 384 BC has been interpreted as evidence of foul play, but that does not necessarily follow. Conjectural inferences about antagonism between Hebryzelmis and Cotys I may be based on the alternative hypothetical identification of the Cotys as son of Seuthes II, the rival of Amadocus I and Hebryzelmis. At any rate, Hebryzelmis appears to have died in 384 BC and to have been succeeded by Cotys I.

The name Hebryzelmis appears among the sons of the later king Seuthes III by Berenice, but it is unclear whether there was any genealogical connection between the kings.

Hebrizelm Hill on Greenwich Island in the South Shetland Islands, Antarctica is named for Hebryzelmis.

References 

 Z. Archibald, The Odrysian Kingdom of Thrace: Orpheus Unmasked, Oxford, 1998.
 P. Delev, From Koroupedion to the Third Mithridatic War (281-73 BCE), in: J. Valeva et al. (eds.), A Companion to Ancient Thrace, Wiley, 2015: 59–74.
 G. Lampousiadēs, "Peri Hebryzelmidos Thrakōn basileōs," Thrakikē Epetēris 1 (1897): 153–165.
 G. Mihajlov, Trakite, 2nd ed., Sofia 2015.
 M. Sears, Athens, Thrace, and the Shaping of Athenian Leadership, Cambridge, 2013. 
 J. Stronk, The Ten Thousand in Thrace, Amsterdam, 1995.
 M. Tacheva, The Kings of Ancient Thrace. Book One, Sofia, 2006.
 S. Topalov, The Odrysian Kingdom from the Late 5th to the Mid-4th C. B.C., Sofia, 1994.
 J. Valeva et al. (eds.), A Companion to Ancient Thrace, Wiley, 2015.
 M. Zahrnt, Early History of Thrace to the Murder of Kotys I (360 BCE), in: J. Valeva et al. (eds.), A Companion to Ancient Thrace, Wiley, 2015: 35–47.
 R. Werner, in: W.-D. von Barloewen (ed.), Abriss der Geschichte antiker Randkulturen, Munich, 1961: 83–150, 239–242.

4th-century BC rulers
Odrysian kings